Faith, Hope y Amor is the seventh studio album released by Frankie J on May 28, 2013. It was nominated for Best Latin Pop Album at the 56th Annual Grammy Awards.

Track listing

References

External links

2013 albums
Frankie J albums